Phoenix Animation Studios was an animation studio headquartered in Toronto, Ontario, Canada. It was founded in 1987 and was closed in 1998.

Filmography

Films
An Angel for Christmas (1996)*
An Easter Tale (a. k. a. Maxwell Saves the Day) (1996)*
Call of the Wild (1996)*
Journey to the Center of the Earth (1996)*
Jungle Boy (1996)*
Noah's Magic Ark (1996)*
The Adventures of Young Moby Dick (1996)*
The Count of Monte Cristo (1997)*
The Little Princess (1996)*
The Prince and the Pauper (1996)*
Swiss Family Robinson (1996)*
The Toy Shop (1996)*
Camelot: The Legend (1998)

Television
Britt Allcroft's Magic Adventures of Mumfie (1996-1998)
Iron Man (Season 2) (1995-1996)
Gadget Boy & Heather (1995-1997)
The True Meaning of Crumbfest (1998) (Television special)
Eckhart (2000-2002)

Animation services
Once Upon a Forest (1993) (additional animation)
Thumbelina (1994) (additional key clean-up/character clean-up/inbetween services)
A Goofy Movie (1995) (additional animation production)
All Dogs Go to Heaven 2 (1996) (animation)

References 

Canadian animation studios
Companies based in Toronto
Mass media companies established in 1987
Mass media companies disestablished in 1998
1987 establishments in Ontario